The Mathis Nunataks are an isolated cluster of nunataks near the head of Arthur Glacier,  east-southeast of Mount Warner, in the Ford Ranges of Marie Byrd Land, Antarctica. They were mapped by the United States Antarctic Service (1939–41) and by the United States Geological Survey from surveys and U.S. Navy air photos (1959–65). The group was named by the Advisory Committee on Antarctic Names for Terry R. Mathis, a traverse engineer with the Byrd Station glaciological strain network, summer season (1967–68), and station engineer with the Byrd Station winter party (1968).

References

Nunataks of Marie Byrd Land